The Portuguese Marine Corps (meaning literally "Corps of Fusiliers") constitutes the Elite Marines Commando and support special operations branch of the Portuguese Navy . It has roles similar to the ones of the USMC Reconnaissance Battalions and of the Royal Marine Commandos. The Corps is specialised in air assault, amphibious warfare, coastal reconnaissance and raiding, commando style raids, counterinsurgency, desert warfare, indirect fire support raiding, irregular warfare, ISTAR, jungle warfare, maneuver warfare, maritime interdiction, mountain warfare, providing security at naval base or shore stations, reconnaissance for gathering military intelligence, support special operations, tracking targets, urban warfare, and VBSS operations. It is an elite marines force, operating as a rapid-reaction force. Today’s Corpo de Fuzileiros is the premier raid force. The fuzileiros remains an all-volunteer force with an intensive screening and selection process followed by combat-focused training. Fuzileiros are resourced to maintain exceptional proficiency, experience and readiness.

History
The Portuguese Marines have their direct origin in the oldest permanent military unit of Portugal, the Regiment of the Navy of the Crown of Portugal (Terço da Armada da Coroa de Portugal), created in 1618. However, since 1585, specialized troops existed to provide artillery and riflemen in the Portuguese warships. The Regiment of the Navy was soon considered an elite unit. As the King of Portugal did not have a royal guard (only the ceremonial Royal Guard of the Halberdiers), this Regiment was also used in the role of bodyguard of the Monarchs.

In the 18th century, a second regiment of naval infantry was created. In 1791, a Regiment of Naval Artillery was added to the force.

In 1797, in the reign of Queen Maria I, all the regiments of the Navy were merged and integrated into the new Royal Brigade of the Navy (Brigada Real da Marinha), which included three divisions: Fusiliers (fuzileiros), Artillerymen (artilheiros) and Artificers (artifices e lastradores). In 1807, the Brigade was reorganized, going to be made of three battalions, all of them of Artillerymen.

In 1808, the Army of Napoleon invaded and occupied Portugal. In order not to be captured and, so, to maintain secure the Portuguese sovereignty, the Royal Family and most of the Court relocated to the Portuguese colony of Brazil, on board of the Portuguese fleet and accompanied by the majority of the Royal Brigade of the Navy. This contingent of the Brigade continued to remain in Brazil, even after its independence in 1822, given origin to what is now the Brazilian Marine Corps. In 1809, a force of the Brigade in Brazil participated in the Portuguese conquest of French Guiana.

With most of the original force of the Brigade remaining in Brazil, in 1822 it started to be reconstituted in Portugal. In 1823, it was organized in two battalions.

During the Portuguese Civil War (1828-1834), the Royal Brigade of the Navy aligned on the side of the Miguelite forces. On the opposite side however, the Liberals created a Battalion of the Navy (Batalhão de Marinha). In 1832, the Liberal Battalion of the Navy was augmented and transformed in a Regiment (Regimento da Armada) with four battalions.

In 1836, already after the end of the Civil War, the Royal Brigade of the Navy was extinguished. It was replaced by the new Naval Battalion (Batalhão Naval) created in 1837.

In each of the ships' crews of the Portuguese Navy, only the officers and the members of the embarked detachments of the Naval Battalion (and previously of the former Royal Brigade of the Navy) were military personnel, with the sailors being civilians. The different status of the several parts of the crews always created issues.

In 1851, the decision was taken to militarize the sailors, with the creation of the Corps of Military Seamen (Corpo de Marinheiros Militares). This Corps started to be responsible for the providing of the ships' crews. It was organized in 22 crew companies, each one subdivided in two half-companies, plus a depot company. Each of these companies and half companies was intended to constitute the crew of a ship, in rotation. All seamen of the Corps received a general training that included seamanship, artillery, infantry, bladed weapon combat, boarding and amphibious landing. In each company, a number of seamen received an advanced training in naval artillery, constituting its squad or artillerymen. This military training meant that the seamen were able to assume the responsibility to perform also the role of naval infantry when needed, what made unnecessary the existence of the Naval Battalion, which was then dissolved.

From this date, whenever there was a need to perform an amphibious operation, landing detachments were constituted with seamen taken from the ships' crews. For the colonial campaigns of the late 19th and early 20th centuries and for the World War I, larger naval infantry forces and naval battalions were organized in the Corps of Seamen itself.

In 1924, a permanent unit of naval infantry was again created, this being the new Brigade of the Naval Guard (Brigada da Guarda Naval). However, it ceased to exist in 1934, with the role of naval infantry being again entirely assumed by the regular seamen when needed.

The Elite Naval Infantry only reappeared as permanent force in 1961, with the beginning of the Colonial War. Besides the Marines School (Escola de Fuzileiros), two types of operational marine units were created at that time, these being the detachments of special marines (DFE, destacamentos de fuzileiros especiais) and the companies of marines (CF, companhias de fuzileiros). While the DFE were designed to operate as amphibious assault units, the CF were focused in the naval patrolling and in the defense of naval ships and facilities. During this war, and up to 1975, more than 14,000 marines fought in Portuguese Guinea, Angola and Mozambique.

Until 1975, a unified Marine Corps Command did not exist, with the diverse DFE and CF being separate units, depending from the several naval and maritime defense commands of the areas where they operated. In this year, the Marine Corps (Corpo de Fuzileiros) was created, unifying all marine units under a single command and become Elite Commando Raid Force.

Organization

Since 2015, the Portuguese Marine Corps is organized into:

 Marines Corps Command (Comando do Corpo de Fuzileiros);
 Marines Corps support departments (Administrative and Financial, Operations, Resources Management and General Support);
 Marines School (Escola de Fuzileiros)- training unit
 1st Marine Battalion (Batalhão de Fuzileiros Nº1 (BF1)) - force protection unit. Includes:
 Naval Police Unit (Unidade de Polícia Naval (UPN)) - military police unit
 Landing Means Unit (Unidade de Meios de Desembarque (UMD)) - landing craft unit
 Boarding Platoon-VBSS (PelBoard) - naval boarding unit
 2nd Marine Battalion (Batalhão de Fuzileiros Nº2 (BF2)) - force projection unit. Includes three permanent Marine forces:
 1st Marine Task Unit (FFZ1) - landing task unit
 2nd Marine Task Unit (FFZ2) - landing task unit
 3rd Marine Task Unit (FFZ3) - landing task unit
 Special Actions Detachment (Destacamento de Acções Especiais (DAE)) - special operations unit. Constitutes a special operations maritime task unit (SOMTU).

The permanent task units of the BF2 are designed to conduct commando raids and other small scale amphibious operations. To conduct larger scale amphibious operations, the Marine Corps can organize a temporary battalion landing team (Batalhão Ligeiro de Desembarque), based on the BF2, reinforced with additional means from the other Marine units and from the General Support Department of the Marine Corps.

The Marine Corps elements are based at the Vale do Zebro facilities (Marines School) and the Alfeite facilities (former Marines Base).

The sole naval field music formation, the Navy Fanfare (Fanfarra da Armada) reports to the Marine Corps Command.

Training

Initial training to become an enlisted Fuzileiro (marine) lasts about 42 weeks. The training is conducted at the Marines School (Escola de Fuzileiros) in Vale de Zebro. It is physically and mentally rigorous and demanding, with only 15% to 35% of the initial trainees passing and becoming Fuzileiros.

The recruits in training are constantly under stress and pressure from instructors leaving them no respite. All activities are timed and scored: marching several tens of kilometers with equipment and weapon, land and mud obstacle courses, navigation at night on the ground.
The training is punctuated by firearms training and special combat techniques, rappelling and climbing, boating, basic demolitions, communications and hand-to-hand combat.

The later stages of the course are mostly field based exercises mimicking real operations within land and amphibious theaters.
This last phase puts into test what was taught and practised in the initial stages like reconnaissance patrols, assault raids, ambushes, CQB/urban operations, SERE, NBC warfare etc.

The course culminates in a 60 km group march which must be completed in a set time.

After completing their training with success, the Fuzileiros receive the dark blue beret and the course badge on an official ceremony before being assigned to operational units.

During and after the Fuzileiros Course, Fuzileiros military personnel receive training in areas as varied as:

 Small unit Tactics
 Basic English
 Long-range reconnaissance patrols
 Escape and evasion techniques
 Inactivation of conventional explosive devices
 Advanced First Aid
 Demolitions, mines and traps
 Combat Shooting
 Driving tactical vehicles
 IED dearmament
 Sapper
 Communications
 NBC - Nuclear, Biological and Chemical
 Surveillance and counter-surveillance of the battlefield
 Abandonment of aircraft in immersion
 Shooting
 Hand-to-hand combat
 Fast Rope/Helicast/Rappel
 VBSS
 CQB

Equipment

Infantry weapons 
Pistols
 Glock 17 9mm pistol;
Submachine guns
Heckler & Koch MP5A3;
 Walther MPK (only used in military parades);
Assault rifles
Heckler & Koch G3 Spuhr 7.62mm;
 Heckler & Koch G36KV 5.56mm (special operations); 
Heckler & Koch HK416 A5 5.56mm (special operations);
 M16A2 with M203 40mm grenade launcher (special operations);
Machine guns
 FN Minimi Mk3 5.56mm (special operations);
 MG3 7.62mm;
 M2HB Browning 12.7mm;
Shotguns
Remington 870 12gauge;
 Mossberg 590 12gauge; 
Sniper rifles
Heckler & Koch HK417 A2 7.62mm sniper variant (special operations);
MSG-90 7.62mm sniper rifle;
Mauser 86SR 7.62mm sniper rifle;
 AW 7.62mm sniper rifle (special operations);
AWSM .338 LM sniper rifle (special operations);
 AW50 12.7mm sniper rifle (special operations);
Grenade launchers
 M203 used on M16A2 (special operations);
 Heckler & Koch GMG;
Mortars
 120mm Tampella B heavy mortar;
 81mm L16 medium mortar;
 60mm fast mortar;
Anti-Tank missiles
 Carl Gustav M3;
 MILAN.

Vehicles

 Traxter HD8;
Nissan Patrol;
 Land Rover Defender 90/110;
 Toyota Land Cruiser HZJ73 armed with MILAN ATGM, M2HB Browning or HK GMG;
 Toyota Hilux;
Mitsubishi L200;
 Mercedes-Benz 24 GD;
 Mercedes-Benz Unimog U1300L;
 Mercedes-Benz Unimog U1550L;
 Mercedes-Benz Unimog U4000;
 Mercedes-Benz Atego 1823; 
 Mercedes-Benz Actros 3340 EMPL Fahrzeugwerk EH/TC 30.000;
 Iveco Trakker 330 with communications shelter;

Amphibious 

 15x LARC-V 
 3x rigid inflatable boats armed with MG 3 machine guns;
 Dozens of Zebro III-class inflatable boats.

Helicopters 

 5x Super Lynx Mk95A

Ranks

Officers

Ratings

See also 
 Portuguese Navy
 Special Actions Detachment
 Sapper Divers Detachments
 List of Portuguese naval ships
 Portuguese Naval Aviation
 Portuguese Colonial War

References

External links
Portuguese Marine Corps official page

Marines
Portuguese Navy
1621 establishments in Portugal
Military units and formations established in 1621
Military of Portugal
Special forces of Portugal